Corinna or Korinna was an ancient Greek lyric poet.

Corinna may also refer to:

People 
 Corinna (given name) a female name equivalent to Corinne
 Heather Corinna (born 1970) writer on sexuality
 Corinna, Ovid's (probably fictitious), lover in the Amores
 Pen name of English poet Elizabeth Thomas (1675–1731)

Places 
 Corinna, Maine, town in Penobscot County, Maine, United States
 Corinna (CDP), Maine, the primary village in the town
 Corinna, Tasmania, a locality in Australia
 Corinna Township, Wright County, Minnesota, United States

Biology 
 Corinna (spider), genus of corinnid sac spiders
 Corinna (diatom), extinct genus of diatoms of uncertain placement within Bacillariophyceae

Other
 "Corinna", a song by Taj Mahal on his album The Natch'l Blues
 Corinna Hodder, a character in the 2011 film Cyberbully

See also
 "Corrine, Corrina", a song 
 
 Corrina
 Corina (disambiguation)
 Corrine (disambiguation)
 Corinne (disambiguation)